Garry Haire (born 24 July 1963) is an English former professional footballer who played as a right winger.

Career
Born in Sedgefield, Haire played for Oxford United, Whitley Bay, Bradford City, Darlington and Rochdale.

He signed for Bradford City in June 1983 from Whitley Bay, leaving the club in February 1985 to sign for Darlington. He made a total of 50 appearances for the club, scoring 15 goals – 13 goals in 43 league matches, 2 goals in 4 FA Cup ties, and 3 League Cup appearances without scoring.

Sources

References

1963 births
Living people
People from Sedgefield
Footballers from County Durham
English footballers
Association football wingers
Oxford United F.C. players
Whitley Bay F.C. players
Bradford City A.F.C. players
Darlington F.C. players
Rochdale A.F.C. players
English Football League players